Salva Nos is a Latin phrase meaning "Save Us", and may refer to:
Salva Nos (album), the debut album by British Vocal Group Mediæval Bæbes, or a song from this album
A song from the anime Noir, composed by Yuki Kajiura